Foncho is a short form of Alfonso

Stick with Foncho to make bananas fair
Foncho (footballer) Alfonso Rodríguez Salas